Mequinenza Dam is a concrete gravity dam in the province of Zaragoza, Spain. It impounds the Ebro creating a large reservoir, which is called Mar de Aragón. About 35 km downstream of Mequinenza dam is Ribarroja dam.

Empresa Nacional Hidroeléctrica del Ribagorzana S.A. (ENHER) was mandated in 1955 by Instituto Nacional de Industria (INI) to build two dams on the Ebro near Mequinenza and Ribarroja. Work on Mequinenza dam started in 1957. The filling of the reservoir began in December 1965. The power plant was operational in 1964 (1966). ENHER was acquired by Endesa in 1999.

Dam
Mequinenza Dam is a 79 m tall (height above foundation) and 461 m long gravity dam with a crest altitude of 124 m. The volume of the dam is 1,100,000 m³. The dam features a  spillway with 6 gates over the dam (maximum discharge 11,000 m³/s) and one bottom outlet (maximum discharge 160 m³/s).

Reservoir
At full reservoir level of 121 m.a.s.l. the reservoir has a surface area of 75.4 km², a total capacity of 1.53 billion m³ and a length of almost 110 km. The average width of the reservoir is about 600 m, its maximum (average) depth is 62 (20) m.

Power plant 
The power plant contains 4 Francis turbine-generators. The initial nameplate capacity was 81 MW each. The turbines, generators and transformers were refurbished from 2007 until 2010 raising the capacity of the new machines to 96 MW each. Maximum flow is 150 m³/s per turbine.

See also

 List of power stations in Spain
 List of dams and reservoirs in Spain

External links

References

Dams in Spain
Hydroelectric power stations in Spain
Gravity dams
Dams completed in 1964
Energy infrastructure completed in 1964
1964 establishments in Spain
Buildings and structures in the Province of Zaragoza